Consolidated Edison Co. v. Public Service Commission, 447 U.S. 530 (1980), was a United States Supreme Court decision addressing the free speech rights of public utility corporations under the First Amendment. In a majority opinion written by Justice Lewis Powell, the Court invalidated an order by the New York Public Service Commission that prohibited utility companies from including inserts on controversial matters of public policy with billing statements.

See also
List of United States Supreme Court cases, volume 447

References

External links 

 First Amendment Library entry on Consolidated Edison Co. v. Public Serv. Comm'n

United States Free Speech Clause case law
1980 in United States case law
New York Public Service Commission
United States Supreme Court cases of the Burger Court
Consolidated Edison
United States Supreme Court cases